Phuket Wittayalai School ( P.K.W, Thai: โรงเรียนภูเก็ตวิทยาลัย(ภ.ว.) ) is a coeducational secondary school located in the Phuket municipality in Thailand. 

It is regarded as the first school in south west Thailand.

History 
Phuket Wittayalai School was established in 1897 as a Thai language school in the Mongkolnimith temple area.  Lord Wisuthiwongsajarn Sangklapamok, the governor of the Phuket province at the time, became the first teacher and head master of the school and developed the academic curricula significantly during his long tenure.

Junior high school 

The junior high school provides a general education. It promotes mathematics, science, technology and foreign languages, providing a beginner's English program. At grade 8 and grade 9 it offers a specialist science and mathematics course.

Senior high school

Science 

The senior high school provides more advanced science and mathematics education, including a course in empowering science, mathematics, technology, and the environment which is part of a special national project.

Languages 

Language courses offered include English, French, Chinese and Japanese. There are also specialist courses in English for mathematics.

References 

 Pkw.ac.th. (2017). ::: Phuketwittayalai School :::. [online] Available at: http://www.pkw.ac.th [Accessed 16 Oct. 2017].

External links 
 Phuket Wittayalai School Official Website

Schools in Thailand
Buildings and structures in Phuket province